Bruvik (historically: Kyrkjebruvik) is a village in Osterøy municipality in Vestland county, Norway. The village is located on the southern shore of the island of Osterøy, along the Sørfjorden.

Historically, Bruvik village was the administrative centre of the municipality of Bruvik which existed from 1870 until 1964.  Bruvik Church has been located here for centuries, as has the parish of Bruvik for the Church of Norway. Bruvik was a central hub for the region since it sat along the fjord and boat travel was the main mode of transportation, but as time progressed, railroads and highways were built on the opposite side of the fjord, and that side grew into larger urban areas while Bruvik has now become less important since it has only one road leading to it from the rest of Norway.

It was the site of school for disobedient boys and later used by the local county jail.

References

Villages in Vestland
Osterøy